This timeline of Cambrian research is a chronological listing of events in the history of geology and paleontology focused on the study of Earth during the span of time lasting from 538.8 to 485.4 million years ago (dates as per 2022 revision) and the legacies of this period in the rock and fossil records.

19th century

1892
 Whiteaves described the new genus Anomalocaris.

20th century

1911
 Charles Walcott described the new genera Pikaia and Wiwaxia.

1912
 Walcott described the new genera Marrella and Opabinia.

1977
 Conway Morris described the new genus Hallucigenia.

See also

 History of paleontology
 Timeline of paleontology
 Timeline of Ordovician research
 Timeline of Silurian research
 Timeline of Devonian research
 Timeline of Carboniferous research
 Timeline of Permian research

References

History of Cambrian geology and paleontology
Cambrian